Gottlob Adolf Krause (January 5, 1850 in Ockrilla near Meissen – February 19, 1938 in Zürich) was a German Africanist and linguist.

Research
Krause researched languages of Central and West Africa, and is credited with labeling the Kwa languages.

Political Beliefs
Krause was an anti-colonialist, and did not cooperate with the German Empire's goals of imposing colonies in Africa. Akinwumi cites this as the reason for which Krause's scientific reputation was undermined in Germany.

Works 
 Ein Beitrag zur Kenntnis der fulischen Sprache in Afrika. In: Mitteilungen der Riebeckschen Nigerexpedition (1884),
 Proben der Sprache von Ghat in der Sahara (Leipzig, 1884).
 Die Musuksprache in Centralafrika. In: Veröffentlichungen der Wiener Akademie. Wien (1886),
 Beitrag zur Kenntnis des Klimas von Salaga, Togo und der Goldküste. Abhandlungen der Kaiserlichen Leopoldinisch-Carolinischen Deutschen Akademie der Naturforscher (Halle/Saale), 93 (3) (1910), pp. 193–472.

References

Further reading

External links
 

1850 births
1938 deaths
People from Meissen (district)
People from the Kingdom of Saxony
Linguists from Germany
German Africanists
German emigrants to Switzerland